Stradbally is a town in County Laois, Ireland, located in the midlands of Ireland along the N80 road, a National Secondary Route, about  from Portlaoise.  It is a townland, a civil parish and historic barony. It is known for its "Steam Rally" and the Electric Picnic.

History
The history of Stradbally dates to the 6th century when a monastery was established at Oughaval, close to the town - and within the present-day parish.

Samuel Lewis's Topographical Dictionary of Ireland (published in 1837), records that the parish at that time contained "2392 inhabitants, of which number, 1799 are in the town".

Birth of motor racing

On 2 July 1903 the Gordon Bennett Cup ran through Stradbally. It was the first international motor race to be held in Ireland. Kildare was chosen at least partly on the grounds that the straightness of the roads would be a safety benefit. As a compliment to Ireland, the British team chose to race in Shamrock green which thus became known as British racing green. The route consisted of several loops of a route which included Kilcullen, Kildare, Monasterevin, Stradbally, Athy, Castledermot, and Carlow. The  race was won by the Belgian racer Camille Jenatzy, driving a Mercedes.

Demography

Between 2011 and 2016 the population of Stradbally increased by 11.1%:
2002: 1634
2006: 1554 (-4.2%)
2011: 1626 (+4.6%)
2016: 1807 (+11.1%) - Preliminary Results

Events

Steam rally

Stradbally is known for its Steam Rally, an annual gathering of enthusiasts of steam-powered vehicles, held in the grounds of the Cosby estate at Stradbally Hall every August bank holiday weekend. Traction engines and other steam-powered vehicles are brought to the rally and displayed and demonstrated, and a steam railway offers rides along a short track. There is also a Steam Museum in Stradbally Town. One of the group of founders was Harold Condell who was an avid Steam enthusiast and owner. He along with his co-founders established the Irish Steam Preservation Society. It also operates narrow gauge steam railway in the grounds of Stradbally Hall. Stradbally is steeped in steam history since the post industrial revolution. Steam traction engines were in abundance in Stradbally after the turn of the last century. Families who had threshing sets and steam engines included the Fennelly family of Market Square, Farrelly family, Cole's of Riverside, Condell's of Old Mills (Whitefields), and one family which is still keeping the tradition going are the Deegan's of Kylebeg and now Brockley whom to this day perform the annual threshing at the Steam Rally.

Stradbally Woodland Railway

In the forest skirting the field where the rally is held there is a Steam railway operated by volunteers of the Irish Steam Preservation Society. It began with the acquisition of one of the Guinness company's steam engines, No 15 built in 1895 and a few coaches in 1966. In 1969 it was replaced by a then surplus steam locomotive, part of BNM's failed experiment in Steam Traction: No2/LM44, built in 1949. The line was changed to  narrow gauge and has been steadily expanded to a balloon loop since. It has since acquired several diesel locomotives. ESB Ruston, Serial 326052, No 4, affectionately known as "Rusty" is the railway's Permanent Way locomotive and supplants No 2 from time to time and Planet, works no. 2014 "Nippy", the oldest operational Diesel locomotive in Ireland. It runs every bank holiday weekend throughout the year and is currently expanding operations.

Electric Picnic

The Electric Picnic is an annual arts-and-music festival which has been staged in late August / early September since 2004 at Stradbally Hall in Stradbally. It is organised by Pod Concerts and Festival Republic, who purchased the majority shareholding in 2009. The Electric Picnic was voted Best Medium-Sized European Festival at the 2010 European Festival Awards, and has been voted Best Big Festival in each of the last four Irish Festival Awards since they began in 2007.

Religion

The Catholic Church of the Sacred Heart is a Gothic Revival church which was completed in 1896 to a cruciform plan. It was designed by William Hague.

Saint Patrick's Church of Ireland Church, also a Gothic Revival church, built in 1764, with one tower. During renovations around 1880 a projecting porch, chancel and vestry were added.

Saint Colman's Orthodox Church, of the Russian Orthodox Church Outside of Russia, is located on the Abbeyleix Road, approximately one mile outside Stradbally.

Sport
Local sports clubs include Stradbally GAA club (the local GAA club), and Stradbally Town A.F.C. (an association football (soccer)  club).

Notable people
 Cecil Day-Lewis late Poet Laureate of the United Kingdom and father of actor Daniel Day-Lewis
 Delaney Brothers, after whom the Leinster Senior Football Trophy is called
 Walter Shanly, Canadian politician, came from Stradbally.
 Kevin O'Higgins, Irish politician, was from Stradbally
 Colm Begley, Australian rules and Gaelic football player

See also
 Oughaval
 List of steam fairs
 List of towns and villages in Ireland

Notes

a.  According to Leinster Leader, Saturday, 11 April 1903 , Britain had to choose a different colour to its usual national colours of red, white and blue, as these had already been taken by Italy, Germany and France respectively. It also stated red as the color for American cars in the 1903 Gordon Bennett Cup.

References

 
Steam festivals
Townlands of County Laois
Towns and villages in County Laois
Baronies of County Laois
Civil parishes of County Laois